Ten Rounds may refer to:
Ten Rounds (Eddie Rabbitt album)
Ten Rounds (Tracy Byrd album)
"Ten Rounds with Jose Cuervo", a single from this album